Dục Mỹ Camp is a former Army of the Republic of Vietnam (ARVN) base northwest of Nha Trang in Khánh Hòa Province, south central Vietnam.

History
The base, located approximately 50 km northwest of Nha Trang, was used by the French Army in the 1950s as a training camp for the Groupement de Commandos Mixtes Aéroportés (GCMA). By 1957 it was the cantonment for the ARVN 15th Light Division. In 1961 it became a training center for ARVN rangers and artillery units.

Duc My was home to the ARVN Ranger training centre and artillery school.

The Dục Mỹ airfield was built as an auxiliary training field to the Republic of Vietnam Air Force Air Training Center at Nha Trang Air Base.

Current use
The base has reverted to housing and farmland, the airfield is still visible on satellite images.

References

Installations of the Army of the Republic of Vietnam